The following is a list of albums released with songs from or based on the animated series VeggieTales.

1990s

VeggieTunes (1995)

VeggieTunes is the debut album by Big Idea, originally released in 1995.

Track listing
VeggieTales Theme Song 
God is Bigger (Than the Boogie Man) (from Where's God when I’m S-Scared)
The Water Buffalo Song (from Where's God when I’m S-Scared)
King Darius Suite (from Where's God when I’m S-Scared)
Oh, No! What We Gonna Do? (from Where's God when I’m S-Scared)
We've Got Some News (from Where's God when I’m S-Scared)
Fear Not, Daniel (from Where's God when I’m S-Scared)
You Were in His Hand (from Where's God when I’m S-Scared)
We Are The Grapes of Wrath (from God Wants Me to Forgive Them)
Some Veggies Went to Sea (from God Wants Me to Forgive Them)
The Forgiveness Song (from God Wants Me to Forgive Them)
Busy, Busy (from Are you my Neighbor)
Love Your Neighbor (from Are you my Neighbor)
The Hairbrush Song (from Are you my Neighbor)
I Can Be Your Friend (from Are you my Neighbor)
What We Have Learned (God Wants Me to Forgive Them version)

A Very Veggie Christmas (1996)

A Very Veggie Christmas is the second album by Big Idea, originally released in November 1996.

Track listing
Talking
Feliz Navidad (sung by Larry the Cucumber & Manuel)
More Talking
The Boar's Head Carol (sung by Archibald Asparagus)
Still More Talking
Ring, Little Bells (sung by Archibald Asparagus & Larry the Cucumber)
Vegetables Talking
Go Tell It on the Mountain (sung by the Grapes)
More Vegetables Talking
Angels We Have Heard On High (sung by Palmy & Everyone)
Vegetables Talking About Watching A Video
Can't Believe It's Christmas (from The Toy That Saved Christmas)
Vegetables Talking During A Video
Grumpy Kids (from The Toy That Saved Christmas)
More Talking
Oh Santa! (from The Toy That Saved Christmas)
Even More Talking
He Is Born, The Holy Child (sung by the French Peas)
Vegetables Talking To Sheep
While by My Sheep (sung by Junior Asparagus & The Sheep)
Vegetables Talking to a Polish Caterer
The 8 Polish Foods Of Christmas (sung by Oscar the Polish Caterer, Jimmy, Larry, Archibald, Pa Grape, Bob, & Junior Asparagus)
Vegetables Tire Of Talking
The Big Medley! Joy to the World/Oh Little Town/O Come Oh Ye Thankful (sung by Larry, Pa Grape, Junior, Mom Asparagus, Archibald, Jimmy, Jerry, & The French Peas)
The End of the Talking! (spoken by Bob & Larry)
Away in a Manger (sung by Junior Asparagus & Mom Asparagus)

VeggieTunes 2 (1998)

VeggieTunes 2 is an album released by Big Idea on May 20, 1998.

Track listing
VeggieTales Theme Song
Dance of the Cucumber (from Rack, Shack, & Benny)
Good Morning George (The Chocolate Factory) (from Rack, Shack, & Benny)
Think Of Me (from Rack, Shack, & Benny)
The Bunny Song 
The Bunny Song (New & Improved)
Stand Up! (from Rack, Shack, & Benny)
Stand Up! (Reprise)
Love My Lips (from Dave & the Giant Pickle)
Big Things Too (from Dave and the Giant Pickle)
The Pirates Who Don't Do Anything
It's Laura's Fault
LarryBoy Theme Song
The Promise Land
The Lord Has Given
Keep Walking
The Lord Has Given (Reprise)
The Promise Land (Reprise)
The Song of the Cebú
What Have We Learned

Larry-Boy The Soundtrack (1999)

Larry-Boy The Soundtrack is an album released by Big Idea on July 27, 1999. It features songs and score from Larry-Boy! And The Fib From Outer Space! and Larry-Boy and the Rumor Weed.

Track listing
Cordial Greetings from Alfred
A Fib Falls and It's Laura's Fault
The Search and It's Lenny's Fault
A Fib Grows and The Water Tower
Junior Tells The Truth!
Look Who's Here To Help
Bumblyburg Groove Remix (Larry-Boy Theme Song)
Bumblyburg Slim Down Remix (Larry-Boy Theme Song)
Thanks But No Thanks
Rumor Weed Introduction
The Seed Is Planted and the Rumor Spreads
The Rumor Weed Song
Larry-Boy to the Rescue
The Sewer and Town Square
The Confession and the Bloom
It's The W's
The Rumor Weed Song (W's Version)
Ta Ta!
Larry-Boy Theme Song (Original)

2000s

VeggieTunes: A Queen, A King and A Very Blue Berry (2000)

VeggieTunes: A Queen, A King and A Very Blue Berry is an album released by Big Idea on October 31, 2000.

Track listing
VeggieTales Theme Song
I'm So Blue (from Madame Blueberry)
Stuff-Mart Suite (from Madame Blueberry)
Salesmunz Rap (from Madame Blueberry)
Thankfulness Song (from Madame Blueberry)
Stuff Stuff, Mart Mart (The Blue Danube)
His Cheeseburger (Love Songs with Mr. Lunt) (from Madame Blueberry)
The Yodeling Veterinarian of the Alps (from The End of Silliness?)
I Love My Duck (from King George and the Ducky)
I Must Have It (from King George and the Ducky)
There Once Was a Man (from King George and the Ducky)
The Selfish Song (from King George and the Ducky)
Endangered Love (Barbara Manatee) (from King George and the Ducky)
The Battle Prelude (from Esther: The Girl Who Became Queen)
Haman's Song (from Esther: The Girl Who Became Queen)
The Battle Is Not Ours (from Esther: The Girl Who Became Queen)
Lost Puppies (from Esther: The Girl Who Became Queen)
What Have We Learned

Silly Songs with Larry (2001)

Silly Songs with Larry is an album released by Big Idea on September 18, 2001. It features all the silly songs ever made up until Lyle the Kindly Viking.

Track listing
The Water Buffalo Song (from Where's God When I’m S-Scared?)
The Hairbrush Song (from Are You my Neighhbor?)
Dance of the Cucumber (from Rack, Shack, and Benny)
I Love My Lips (from Dave and the Giant Pickle)
The Pirates Who Don't Do Anything (from Very Silly Song!)
The Song of the Cebú (from Josh and the Big Wall)
His Cheeseburger (Love Songs with Mr. Lunt) (from Madame Blueberry)
The Yodeling Veterinarian of the Alps (from The End of Silliness?)
Endangered Love (Barbara Manatee) (from King George and the Ducky)
Larry's High Silk Hat (Classy Songs with Larry [Silly Songs with Larry at the Beginning]) (from Lyle the Kindly Viking)
Lost Puppies (from Esther: The Girl Who Became Queen)
Oh, Santa! (from The Toy that Saved Christmas)
Do the Moo Shoo (from The Ultimate Silly Song Countdown)
Silly Song Remix Medley

Bob and Larry's Sunday Morning Songs (2002)

Bob and Larry's Sunday Morning Songs is an album released by Big Idea on May 21, 2002. This is an album in the Sing-Alongs series.

This Little Light of Mine
Down in My Heart
He's Got the Whole Word in his Hands
My God is So Big
The B-I-B-L-E
Joshua Fought the Battle of Jericho
God's Way
Over, Over
Zacchaeus was a wee little Man
This is My Commandment
Love Your Neighbor
Give Me Oil in My Lamp
I Believe God Can
Peace Like a River
Jesus Loves the Little Children
Split-Tracks (tracks 16-30 repeat in karaoke version)

Junior's Bedtime Songs (2002)

Junior's Bedtime Songs is an album released by Big Idea on May 21, 2002.

Twinkle, Twinkle Little Star
Braham's Lullaby
A Bushel and a Peck
Close to You
Are You Sleeping?
My Day
Thankfulness Song
God is So Good
God's Love
Love Him in the Morning
Corner of the World
One in a Million
Think Of Me
All Through the Night
Angels Will Keep Watch
Split-Tracks (tracks 16-30 repeat in karaoke version)

Jonah A Veggietales Movie Original Movie Soundtrack (2002)

Jonah A Veggietales Movie Original Movie Soundtrack is an album released by Big Idea on August 27, 2002.

Track listing
Billy Joe McGuffrey
Bald Bunny
Steak and Shrimp
The Pirates Who Don't Do Anything
Message From The Lord
It Cannot Be
Second Chances (Anointed)
Jonah Was A Prophet
In The Belly of the Whale (Newsboys) 
Billy Joe McGuffrey (Chris Rice)
The Pirates Who Don't Do Anything (Relient K)
Opening Titles
The Joppa Market
Jonah Meets The Pirates
The Dream/Cards at Sea
Jonah Meets The Whale
Nineveh 
On The Hill
Credits Song

Pirates' Boat Load of Fun (2002)

Pirates' Boat Load of Fun is an album released by Big Idea on October 8, 2002.

Track listing
The Slowest Ship on the Ocean
Sailing, Sailing/Row, Row, Row Your Boat
Get On Board
Deep And Wide
Did You Ever See A Lassie/My Ducky Lies Over The Ocean
She'll Be Coming' Round The Mountain
There's a Hole in the Bottom of the Sea
Modern Major General
The Ballad Of Jonah
Who Did Swallow Jonah!
The Wonder Of It All
We're Vikings
That's Where My Treasure Is
Wide As The Ocean
Erie Canal
Split-Tracks (tracks 16-30 repeat with music and voices split)

Bob and Larry's Backyard Party (2002)

Bob and Larry's Backyard Party is an album released by Big Idea on October 8, 2002.

Track listing
Take Me Out to the Ballgame (Backyard)
B-I-N-G-O (BONGO)
Head, Shoulders, Knees, and Toes... Do Your Ears Hang Low?
I Can Be Your Friend (from Are you my Neighbor)
If You're Happy and You Know It
How Many Monkeys?
His Banner Over Me Is Love
Come Over to My House and Play
You Are My Sunshine
The Green Grass Grows All Around
This Old Man
The Hokey Pokey
Polly Wolly Doodle
A Friend is a Friend
Shout! (originally by the Isley Brothers)
Split track (voices and music split)

O Veggie, Where Art Thou? (2003)

O Veggie, Where Art Thou? is an album released by Big Idea on April 1, 2003.

Track listing
Grandpa Bob's Old Time Radio Show
Old Time Religion
In the Highways
Amazing Grace
Do Lord/I'll Fly Away
Swing Low, Sweet Chariot
Standing in the Need of Prayer
Ezekiel Saw the Wheel
Just a Closer Walk with Thee
Have a Little Talk with Jesus
One Lord
River Medley
When the Saints Go Marching In
Good Shepherd (Psalm 23)
Sweet, Sweet Spirit
Grandpa Bob's Old Time Radio Show (Reprise)
Split-Tracks (tracks 17-32 repeat in karaoke version)

On the Road with Bob and Larry (2003)

On the Road with Bob and Larry is an album released by Big Idea on April 1, 2003.

Track listing
On the Road Again
Stop and Go with Mercy
The Wheels on the Bus
Bicycle Built for Two
The Surrey with the Fringe on Top
I've Been Working on the Railroad/Down by the Station
This Train
The Bear Went Over the Mountain
Ease on Down the Road
Driving Medley
I'm Gonna Sing, I'm Gonna Shout
Oh, You Can't Get to Heaven
Are We There Yet?
The Waiting Game
Happy Trails
Split-Tracks (tracks 16-30 repeat in karaoke version)

Veggie Rocks (2004)

VeggieTales: Veggie Rocks! is an album released in 2004 of Silly Songs and various other songs from VeggieTales covered by popular Christian rock bands.

Track listing
 "VeggieTales Theme Song" - Rebecca St. James (3:41)
 "I Love My Lips" - Stevenson (4:11)
 "Promised Land" - Sanctus Real (3:05)
 "In The Belly of the Whale" - Newsboys (3:15)
 "The Water Buffalo Song" - Superchick (2:58)
 "I'm So Blue" - Paul Colman (3:16)
 "Hairbrush Song" - Audio Adrenaline (5:13)
 "The Pirates Who Don't Do Anything" - Relient K (2:14)
 "I Can be Your Friend" - The O.C. Supertones (2:45)
 "His Cheeseburger" - Tait (2:44)
 "Stand" - Skillet (4:11)

VeggieTunes 4 (2004)

VeggieTunes 4 is an album released on October 5, 2004.

Track listing
VeggieTales Theme Song
Happy Ki-Yi Birthday (from The Ballad of Little Joe)
Dream of a Dozen Cactus (from The Ballad of Little Joe)
Oh Little Joe I (McPotiphar's Song) (from The Ballad of Little Joe)
I'm Blue (from The Ballad of Little Joe)
Oh Little Joe II (Jail Cell) (from The Ballad of Little Joe)
Mayor's Dream (from The Ballad of Little Joe)
Oh Little Joe III (Instrumental) (from The Ballad of Little Joe)
Another Easter Day (An Easter Carol)
113 Years Ago (An Easter Carol)
You Didn't Listen Ebenezer (An Easter Carol)
Boids (An Easter Carol)
The Factory (score) (from An Easter Carol)
Hope's Song (from An Easter Carol)
Another Easter Day (reprise) (from An Easter Carol)
Sport Utility Vehicle (from A Snoodle's Tale)
I Want to Dance (from A Snoodle's Tale)
I Want to Dance (disco version) (from A Snoodle's Tale)
What Have We Learned (Western version)

Bob and Larry's Campfire Songs (2004)

Bob and Larry's Campfire Songs is an album released in 2004.

Track listing
God Is Bigger
Stop, Drop and Roll
Buffalo Gals/Light of the Silvery Moon
For the Beauty of the Earth
King Jesus Is All
Kumbaya
Going on a Bear Hunt
Clementine
Oh Shenandoah
This Is My Father's World
On Top of Old Smokey
Pass It On
The Marshmallow Song
Home on the Range
Friends Are Friends Forever

Junior's Playtime Songs (2004)

Junior's Playtime Songs is an album released in 2004.

Track listing
Come Over to My House and Play
Playtime Song
Love My Lips (from Dave and the Giant Pickle)
Consider Yourself
Boom, Boom Ain't It Great to Be Crazy?
Rocka My Soul
Here) We Go Loopty Loo
John Jimmy Jingleheimer Schmidt
Look Olaf!
I Got a Funny Feeling
My Aunt Came Back
Allelu, Allelu
What Do You Do (With a Tired Veggie?)
Friends Medley: Make New Friends/The More We Get Together
A Friend Is a Friend

Bob and Larry's Toddler Songs (2005)

Bob and Larry's Toddler Songs is an album released in 2005.

Track listing
This Is the Day
The Wheels on the Bus
He's Got the Whole World in His Hands
The Hand Song
Love Your Neighbor
I've Been Working on the Railroad
If You're Happy and You Know It
Don't Ya Know
This Little Light of Mine
I've Got Peace Like a River
Thankfulness Song
The Dinner Time Song
Twinkle, Twinkle, Little Star
Think of Me
God Is So Good

More Bob and Larry's Sunday Morning Songs (2005)

More Bob and Larry's Sunday Morning Songs is an album released in 2005.

Track listing
Open Up the Bible
Who Built the Ark?
I Am a Promise
Jacob's Ladder
I Got Shoes
Gospel Ship
God's Love
Father Abraham
Promised Land
Jonah Was a Prophet
Wise Man Built His House Upon the Rock
Fishers of Men/Peter, James & John in a Sailboat
It's a Miracle
Oh, How I Love Jesus
I Will Sing of the Mercies of the Lord/Leaning on the Everlasting Arms

The Incredible Singing Christmas Tree (2005)

Track listing
O Christmas Tree
Puppy Love
The Friendly Beasts
Jingle Ka-Ching
Battling Kings
Silent Night
Christmas Sizzle Boy
Candy Cane Blues
Was He a Boy Like Me?
What My Father Did on Christmas Eve
Here We Come a Caroling/Ding Dong Merrily on High
What Child is This?/The First Noel
Hark! The Herald Angels Sing/Angels We Have Heard on High
Joy to the World
For Unto Us A Child is Born
It's About Love

A Very Veggie Easter (2006)

A Very Veggie Easter is a 2006 album released by EMI and Big Idea] as a tie-in with the release of the VeggieTales episode "An Easter Carol".

Track listing

 "Hosanna Lord Hosanna"
 "All Around the World"
 "Christ The Lord Is Risen Today"
 "The Easter Bunny Hop"
 "The Easter Song"
 "How Now Easter Cow"
 "Count Your Eggs"
 "An Empty Egg"
 "Hope's Song (re-recording from An Easter Carol)"
 "First Things First"
 "Christ The Lord Is Risen Today"
 "I Know That My Redeemer Liveth"

All Songs By Mike Nawrocki & Kurt Heinecke
(c) 2005–2006 Bob & Larry Publishing

Christian Hit Music (2007)

Christian Hit Music features VeggieTales characters singing hits from current Christian music artists.

Track listing
Big House - (originally by Audio Adrenaline)
In the Light - (originally by dcTalk)
Flood - (originally by Jars of Clay)   
I Can Only Imagine - (originally by MercyMe) 
Shine (originally by Newsboys)
Dive - (originally by Steven Curtis Chapman)
Meant To Live - (originally by Switchfoot)
Sadie Hawkins Dance - (originally by Relient K)  
Baby, Baby - (originally by Amy Grant)
I'll Take You There - (originally by The Staple Singers)
Blue Skies - (originally by Point of Grace)
Made to Love - (originally by tobyMac) 
Smellin' Coffee - (originally by Chris Rice)
Trumpet of Jesus - (originally by The Imperials)  
Place in this World - (originally by Michael W. Smith)

All Songs by Mike Nawrocki
(c) 2007 Bob & Larry Publishing

Reviews
Jesus Freak Hideout

VeggieTales Greatest Hits (2008)

VeggieTales Greatest Hits is an album released in 2008.

Track listing
VeggieTales Theme Song
God is Bigger (Than the Boogie Man)
The Water Buffalo Song
The Hairbrush Song
I Can Be Your Friend
Stand
The New and Improved Bunny Song
Big Things Too
The Pirates Who Don't Do Anything
The Song of the Cebú
His Cheeseburger (Love Songs with Mr. Lunt)
Thankfulness Song Medley
My Day
Bellybutton
What We Have Learned (ukulele)
Foreign Exchange Veggies

25 Favorite Very Veggie Tunes (2009)

Track listing
VeggieTales Theme Song 
God is Bigger (Than the Boogie Man) (from Where's God when I’m S-Scared)
The Water Buffalo Song (from Where's God when I’m S-Scared)
King Darius Suite (from Where's God when I’m S-Scared)
Oh, No! What We Gonna Do? (from Where's God when I’m S-Scared)
We've Got Some News (from Where's God when I’m S-Scard)
Fear Not, Daniel (from Where's God when I’m S-Scared)
We Are The Grapes of Wrath (from God Wants Me to Forgive Them)
The Forgiveness Song (from God Wants Me to Forgive Them)
Busy, Busy (from Are you my Neighbor)
Love Your Neighbor (from Are you my Neighbor)
The Hairbrush Song (from Are you my Neighbor)
I Can Be Your Friend (from Are you my Neighbor)
Dance of the Cucumber (from Rack, Shack, & Benny)
Good Morning George (The Chocolate Factory) (from Rack, Shack, & Benny)
Think Of Me (from Rack, Shack, & Benny)
The Bunny Song (New & Improved)
Stand Up! (from Rack, Shack, & Benny)
Love My Lips (from Dave & the Giant Pickle)
Big Things Too (from Dave and the Giant Pickle)
The Pirates Who Don't Do Anything
It's Laura's Fault
The Promised Land
Keep Walking
The Song of the Cebú

References

VeggieTales
Albums
VeggieTales
VeggieTales
1990s soundtrack albums
2000s soundtrack albums
Lists of albums